Berchtesgadener Ache is a river of Bavaria, Germany and of Salzburg, Austria. It is formed at the confluence of the Ramsauer Ache and the Königsseer Ache in Berchtesgaden. It flows into the Salzach near Anif.

See also
List of rivers of Bavaria

References

Rivers of Bavaria
Berchtesgadener Land
Berchtesgaden Alps
Rivers of Salzburg (state)
Rivers of Austria
Rivers of Germany
International rivers of Europe